The Basilica of the Fourteen Holy Helpers (German: Basilika Vierzehnheiligen) is  a church located  near the town of Bad Staffelstein near Bamberg, in Bavaria, southern Germany. The late Baroque-Rococo basilica, designed by Balthasar Neumann, was constructed between 1743 and 1772. It is dedicated to the Fourteen Holy Helpers, a group of saints venerated together in the Catholic Church, especially in Germany at the time of the Black Death.

Location

The Basilica overlooks the river Main in Franconia. It sits on a hillside, and on the hillside opposite is Schloss Banz, a former Baroque abbey.  Together they are known as the Goldene Pforte or golden portal, an entryway to the historic Franconian towns of Coburg, Kronach, Kulmbach and Bayreuth.

Legend
In the fall of 1445, young shepherd Hermann Leicht saw a crying child in a field near a Cistercian monastery in Langheim. As he bent down to pick up the child, it abruptly disappeared. A short time later, the child reappeared in the same spot along with two floating lights and Hermann reported it to the Cistercians. The next summer, he saw the child a third time. This time, the child bore a red cross on its chest and was accompanied by other figures. The child said they were the fourteen helpers and would help others if a chapel was erected for them. The two lights descended and the vision disappeared, after which the healing miracles began.

The Cistercian brothers to whom the land belonged erected a chapel, which immediately attracted pilgrims. An altar was consecrated as early as 1448. Pilgrimages to the Vierzehnheiligen continue to the present day between May and October.

The mercy altar of the Vierzehnheiligen 
The fourteen saints represented in the altar are:

On the balustrade:
Blaise (also Blase and Blasius) (February 3), bishop and martyr, invoked against illness of the throat
Cyriacus (Cyriac) (August 8), deacon and martyr, invoked against temptation on the death-bed
Denis (Dionysius) (October 9), bishop and martyr, invoked against headache
Erasmus (Elmo) (June 2), bishop and martyr, invoked against intestinal ailments
In the altar niches:
Barbara (December 4), virgin and martyr, invoked against fever and sudden death
Catherine of Alexandria (November 25), virgin and martyr, invoked against sudden death
On the buttresses:
Agathius (or Acacius) (May 8), martyr, invoked against headache
Christopher (Christophorus) (July 25), martyr, invoked against bubonic plague
Eustachius (Eustace, Eustathius) (September 20), martyr, invoked against family discord
Giles (Aegidius) (September 1), hermit and abbot, invoked against plague, for a good confession
On top of the baldachin:
George (April 23), soldier-martyr, for the health of domestic animals
Margaret of Antioch (July 20), virgin and martyr, invoked in childbirth
Pantaleon (July 27), bishop and martyr, for physicians
Vitus (June 15), martyr, invoked against epilepsy

The high altar of Vierzehnheiligen 

The central scene of the unobstructed and towering high altar is a larger-than-life painting showing the Assumption of the Blessed Virgin Mary. The statues depict her spouse Joseph, her father Joachim, and David and Zachariah.

Pulpit
Free floating white putti bear the pulpit ornamented with the golden reliefs of the Evangelists surrounded by shellwork. The pulpit tester (sound board) is made of rays in a spherical shape.

See also
 History of early modern period domes

References

Citations

Sources

External links

  The Basilica's official website
 A web page on the Basilica from College of the Holy Cross

Basilica churches in Germany
Fourteen Holy Helpers
Roman Catholic churches completed in 1772
Baroque architecture in Bavaria
Lichtenfels (district)
Minor basilicas in Germany